Chris Harper (born 23 November 1994) is an Australian cyclist, who currently rides for UCI WorldTeam . In October 2020, he was named in the startlist for the 2020 Giro d'Italia, his first Grand Tour.

Major results

2016
 2nd  Road race, Oceania Under–23 Road Championships
 6th Road race, Oceania Road Championships
2017
 6th Overall Tour de Langkawi
2018
 1st Overall UCI Oceania Tour
 1st  Road race, Oceania Road Championships
 3rd Road race, National Road Championships
 4th Overall Tour of Japan
1st  Young rider classification
 6th Overall Herald Sun Tour
 7th Overall New Zealand Cycle Classic
2019
 1st  Overall Tour de Savoie Mont Blanc
1st  Points classification
1st  Mountains classification
1st Stages 4 & 5
 1st  Overall Tour of Japan
1st  Young rider classification
1st Stage 6 
 2nd Road race, National Road Championships
 Oceanian Road Championships
3rd  Road race
6th Time trial
 4th Overall Herald Sun Tour
 5th Overall Tour of Bihor
2020
 3rd Time trial, National Road Championships
2021
 4th Time trial, National Road Championships
 4th Overall UAE Tour
2022
 1st Stage 1 (TTT) Vuelta a España
 9th Overall Sibiu Cycling Tour
2023
 5th Time trial, National Road Championships

Grand Tour general classification results timeline
Sources:

References

External links

1994 births
Living people
Australian male cyclists
People from Far North Queensland
Cyclists from Queensland
20th-century Australian people
21st-century Australian people